Cornu (pl. cornua) is a Latin word for horn.
Cornu may also refer to:

Cornu (horn), an ancient musical instrument

People
Dominique Cornu (born 1985), Belgian road and track cyclist
Marie Alfred Cornu (1841–1902), French physicist for whom the Cornu spiral (also known as the Euler spiral) is named
Paul Cornu (1881–1944), French engineer sometimes credited as the creator of the first helicopter

Places
 Cornu, Prahova, a commune in Prahova County, Romania
 Cornu Luncii, a commune in Suceava County, Romania
 Cornu, a village in Bucerdea Grânoasă Commune, Alba County, Romania
 Cornu, a village in Orodel Commune, Dolj County, Romania
 Cornu de Jos (disambiguation), multiple places
 Cornu–, a prefix used to indicate a relation to Cornwall

Science and medicine
 Euler spiral, also known as a Cornu spiral
 Latin name for a cutaneous horn, an eruption of the skin, mostly in fair skinned persons which can be benign but is often a precursor of skin cancer

Anatomy
 Cornu ammonis, a part of the hippocampus of the brain
 Cornu coccygeum, one of two upward projecting processes which articulate with the sacrum
 Cornua of the hyoid, the greater and lesser horns of the hyoid bones
 Cornu anterius and cornu posterius, parts of the lateral ventricles of the brain
 Horns of the spinal cord
 Cornu anterius medullae spinalis
 Cornu posterius medullae spinalis
 Sacral Cornua, two small processes projecting inferiorly on either side of the sacral hiatus leading into the sacral canal
 Uterine cornu, one of two uterine horns, located near the entry of the Fallopian tube

Zoology
 Cornu (gastropod), a genus of snails
 Cornu aspersum, species of brown garden snail, formerly known as Helix aspersa
 One of two horn claspers associated with the penis of a bee drone

See also
 Le Cornu, a surname
 Corneanu (disambiguation)
 Cornetu (disambiguation)
 Corni (disambiguation)
 Cornus (disambiguation)
 Horn (disambiguation)